Potamonautes aloysiisabaudiae is a species of crustacean in the family Potamonautidae. It is found in the Democratic Republic of the Congo, Sudan, and Uganda. Its natural habitat is rivers.

References

Potamoidea
Freshwater crustaceans of Africa
Crustaceans described in 1906
Taxonomy articles created by Polbot